Copelatus assamensis is a species of diving beetle. It is part of the genus Copelatus of the subfamily Copelatinae in the family Dytiscidae. It was described by Vazirani in 1970.

This species is distributed throughout South Asia.

References

assamensis
Beetles described in 1970
Beetles of Asia